Chileana is a genus of soil centipedes in the clade Linotaeniidae and family Geophilidae found in southern Chile. It currently has only one species, C. araucanensis. Females of this species are about 30mm long, with a pale yellow body and a red head; bearing 12–15 pleural pores; long, tapering antennae with sparse basal sections and rather hairy distal sections; and a labrum with four median tubercles bearing a few cilia on the sides. Males have 10 pleural pores, thick ultimate legs armed with claws, and 43 leg pairs.

Taxonomy
Chileana araucanensis was originally named Linotaenia araucanensis Silvestri, 1899, and it was later moved to the genus Araucania Chamberlin, 1956. However, Araucania Chamberlin was found to be a senior homonym of Araucania Pates, 1947, and thus was renamed Chileana Özdikmen, 2009.

References

Further reading

 
 

Geophilomorpha
Monotypic arthropod genera